Enrique López Albújar (November 23, 1872 Chiclayo – March 6, 1966, Lima) was a Peruvian writer who focused mainly on poetry.

National University of San Marcos alumni
1872 births
1966 deaths
Peruvian male writers
People from Chiclayo